HMTA could refer to:
Heavy Metal - Tungsten Alloy - a tungsten alloy used in dense inert metal explosive bombs.
The organic compound hexamethylenetetramine also called hexamine.
Hazardous Materials Transportation Act (1975)